Thirukanurpatti is a village in the Thanjavur taluk of Thanjavur district, Tamil Nadu, India.

Demographics 

As per the 2001 census, Thirukanurpatti had a total population of 4003 with 1999 males and 2004 females. The sex ratio was 1003. The literacy rate was 64.18.

References 

 

Villages in Thanjavur district